Congostinas is one of 24 parishes (administrative divisions) in Lena, a municipality within the province and autonomous community of Asturias, in coastal northern Spain.  

Its post code is 33694.

Villages

The villages of Congostinas include:

 Congostinas
 Ḷḷinares
 Ḷḷinares de Baxo
 Ḷḷinares de Riba
 Misiegos
 San Pelayo

References

External links

 Asturian society of economic and industrial studies, English language version of "Sociedad Asturiana de Estudios Económicos e Industriales" (SADEI)

Parishes in Lena